The Turtle River is a river of Minnesota. It is a tributary of the Mississippi River and was formally thought to be the headwaters of the Mississippi River.

See also
List of rivers of Minnesota
List of longest streams of Minnesota

References

External links
Minnesota Watersheds
USGS Hydrologic Unit Map - State of Minnesota (1974)

Rivers of Minnesota
Tributaries of the Mississippi River